Mariano Antonio Fernández Farina (born 2 September 1978) is a former Argentine footballer.

Fernández spent over 10 seasons in European Union nations, especially in Italian lower divisions. Fernández also holds Spanish nationality.

Biography
Born in Lanús, within the Greater Buenos Aires, Fernández started his professional career at Club Atlético Lanús. Since 2001–02 season he left Argentina for Europe, firstly for Austrian club Sturm Graz. In 2002–03 season he played for Portuguese Premier League club Beira-Mar. In 2003, he was signed by Italian Serie B club Torino Calcio, but on loan from Fénix, believed to be a proxy for the third parties owner. In 2004–05 season he was signed by Spanish second division club Real Murcia. However, he only played 6 games. In 2005–06 season he joined Segunda División B club Córdoba.

Fernández returned to Argentina for Nueva Chicago. He only played 8 games in 2006–07 Primera División, all in the first half of the season (Apertura 2006). He was signed by Romanian Liga I club Dinamo Bucharest in 2007–08 Liga I but again only played a handful games, with 4 more games for Dinamo II. Fernández also played as an unused bench in 2007–08 UEFA Cup First Round.

Italian Lega Pro
In January 2008 Fernández returned to Italy and spent rest of his career in Italian third and fourth division (Lega Pro). At first he was signed by Cisco Roma, then with Gela in 2008–09 season.

In July 2009 he was signed by Sorrento. In August 2010 he left for Casale. In January 2011 he was signed by Cosenza but the club bankrupted at the end of season.

On 31 August 2011 he was signed by third division club Siracusa to replace Giovanni Iodice who moved to Casale Monferrato.

References

External links
 
 
 
 
 
 Mariano Fernández at Playmakerstats.com
 
 
 Football.it Profile 
 

Argentine footballers
Club Atlético Lanús footballers
Club Atlético Belgrano footballers
SK Sturm Graz players
S.C. Beira-Mar players
Torino F.C. players
Real Murcia players
Córdoba CF players
Nueva Chicago footballers
FC Dinamo București players
Atletico Roma F.C. players
S.S.D. Città di Gela players
A.S.D. Sorrento players
Casale F.B.C. players
Cosenza Calcio players
U.S. Siracusa players
Paganese Calcio 1926 players
F.C. Matera players
Argentine Primera División players
Austrian Football Bundesliga players
Primeira Liga players
Serie B players
Liga I players
Liga II players
Argentine expatriate footballers
Expatriate footballers in Austria
Expatriate footballers in Portugal
Expatriate footballers in Italy
Expatriate footballers in Spain
Expatriate footballers in Romania
Argentine expatriate sportspeople in Austria
Argentine expatriate sportspeople in Romania
Argentine expatriate sportspeople in Portugal
Argentine expatriate sportspeople in Italy
Argentine expatriate sportspeople in Spain
Association football defenders
Sportspeople from Lanús
1978 births
Living people